Dorytomus rufatus is a species of weevil native to Europe.

References

External links
 

Curculionidae
Beetles described in 1888
Beetles of Europe